Carlton Susumi Ogawa (August 29, 1934 – September 23, 2006) was a Canadian rower who competed in the 1956 Summer Olympics. In 1956 he was the coxswain of the Canadian boat which won the silver medal in the eights event.

References

External links
 Carlton Ogawa's profile at Sports Reference.com

1934 births
2006 deaths
Canadian male rowers
Coxswains (rowing)
Olympic rowers of Canada
Rowers at the 1956 Summer Olympics
Olympic silver medalists for Canada
Olympic medalists in rowing
Medalists at the 1956 Summer Olympics